The 1951 Ladies Open Championships was held at the Lansdowne Club in London from 5–11 February 1951. Janet Morgan won her second title defeating Joan Curry in a repeat of the 1950 final.

Seeds

Draw and results

First round

denotes seed *
Mrs Audrey Bayes (Wal 4*) withdrew because of influenza

Second round

Third round

Quarter-finals

Semi-finals

Final

References

Women's British Open Squash Championships
Women's British Open Squash Championships
Women's British Open Squash Championships
Squash competitions in London
Women's British Open Championships
British Open Championships 
Women's British Open Squash Championships